National Democratic Alliance (NDA) is a coalition of predominantly right-wing political parties in India.

National Democratic Alliance may also refer to:

 National Democratic Alliance (Aruba)
 National Democratic Alliance (Georgia)
 National Democratic Alliance (Hungary)
 National Democratic Alliance (Iraq)
 National Democratic Alliance (Israel), a common misnomer for the National Democratic Assembly
 National Democratic Alliance (Italy) (defunct party)
 National Democratic Alliance (Kuwait)
 National Democratic Alliance, a political party in Libya
 National Democratic Alliance (Malawi)
 National Democratic Alliance (Sierra Leone)
 National Democratic Alliance (Sudan)
 National Democratic Alliance (Trinidad & Tobago)
 National Democratic Alliance (Turks and Caicos Islands), a party involved in the Turks and Caicos Islands Constitutional suspension (1986–1988)
 Ukrainian National Democratic Alliance (1925–1939)

See also
 National Democratic Alliance Army, a rebel army in northeastern Burma